The men's triple jump at the 2016 IAAF World Indoor Championships took place on March 19, 2016.

In the final, Dong Bin hit 17.18 on his first attempt, enough to win the competition.  He later improved upon that with 17.29 in the third round and the ultimate winner 17.33 in the fifth. Benjamin Compaoré held down second place with a 16.77 in the first round, which he steadily improved three times.  He looked to have enough for silver until Max Hess took his fourth attempt.   On his last visit to Oregon, Hess hit a big personal best to get the World Junior silver medal.  20 months later, he hit another big personal best, a 59 cm (almost 2 feet) improvement to 17.14 to grab the silver.  Almost to prove it wasn't a fluke, Hess jumped another 17.14 in the final round.

Results
The final was started at 17:00.

References

Triple jump
Triple jump at the World Athletics Indoor Championships